Stolpen is a town in the district of Sächsische Schweiz-Osterzgebirge, in Saxony, Germany. It is a historical town, that grew at the foot of the Schloßberg with the castle Burg Stolpen.

Burg Stolpen 

Burg Stolpen is a castle built on top of the Schloßberg. The first defensive works were built about 1100 and it was first documented in 1222. Owned by the Bishop of Meißen for nearly 350 years, it passed to the Electorate of Saxony and was expanded in Renaissance style. In 1675 it was further expanded as a fortress. Anna Constantia von Brockdorff, Countess of Cosel, was imprisoned in the castle from 1716 until her death in 1765. The castle fell into disrepair towards the end of the 18th century. It became a museum in 1875, and has been partly restored since then.

Schloßberg 

Schloßberg is a hill just to the south of the town formed of prominent basalt columns. It is the formation referred to by Georgius Agricola when he coined the term basalt.

Historical population

* over 10 years old

Twin towns – sister cities
Stolpen is twinned with:

  Hilzingen, Germany 
  Amöneburg, Germany
  Garching an der Alz, Germany
  Jockgrim, Germany
  Sipplingen, Germany
  Sloup v Čechách, Czech Republic

Notable people
Walter von Boetticher (1853–1945), historian and physician, was a general practitioner at Stolpen
The Doll Family, a circus sideshow act, were born in Stolpen
Christian Friedrich Henrici, also known as Picander, Bach's librettist (St Matthew Passion's text was written by him) was born here.

References

External links 
 
 
  (in German and English)
 Burg Stolpen (in German)